Shaunavon can refer to:

 Shaunavon, Saskatchewan, a town in Saskatchewan, Canada
Shaunavon (electoral district), a former provincial electoral district in Saskatchewan, Canada
Shaunavon Airport, an airport near Shaunavon, Saskatchewan
 Shaunavon Formation, a stratigraphical unit of the Western Canadian Sedimentary Basin